Pinkish Black is an American experimental sci-fi avant-metal synth-doom band from Fort Worth, Texas. The musical duo includes drums and synthesizer/keyboard only.

Formation (2010)

In 2005, the members were part of an experimental hard rock trio called The Great Tyrant.  After Tommy Atkins, the bassist for The Great Tyrant, committed suicide in 2010, the remaining members continued on as a duo ultimately named Pinkish Black.  Daron Beck played keyboards and vocals and Jon Teague remained on drums and synths,

Self-titled debut (2011-2012)

The band had been signed from the Dada Drumming record label to Handmade Birds. Here, they spent a great deal of time recording and mixing the music for their upcoming debut. On May 5, 2012, the self-titled LP was released.

Century Media & Relapse Records (2012-Present)

Beck and Teague were signed to Century Media Records on November 12, 2012. Their second album Razed to the Ground was released on September 17, 2013.

On December 4, 2014, Relapse Records announced that they had signed the band, and that the label would be releasing both Pinkish Black's third full-length and the final works of Pinkish Black predecessors The Great Tyrant (entitled The Trouble With Being Born).

In 2019, Relapse released an album called Concept Unification which explored themes of anxiety, futility and emptiness that Beck claims to have experienced as a child after Showbiz Pizza rebranded itself into a Chuck E. Cheese's.

In 2020, they released a joint album with avant-jazz band Yells at Eels entitled Vanishing Light in the Tunnel of Dreams.

Discography 
Studio albums
2012: Pinkish Black (Handmade Birds)
2013: Razed to the Ground (Century Media)
2015: Bottom of the Morning (Relapse Records)
2019: Concept Unification (Relapse Records)
2020: Vanishing Light in the Tunnel of Dreams (Ayler Records)

References

External links

 Pinkish Black on Bandcamp
Pinkish Black on Facebook
Biography on Relapse Records.com

American experimental rock groups
Musicians from Texas